Todd Hardy (May 17, 1957 – July 28, 2010) was a Canadian carpenter, trade union activist, and politician who served as Leader of the Yukon New Democratic Party. He has also served as Leader of the Opposition in the Yukon Legislative Assembly from 2002 to 2006.

A carpenter by trade, Hardy was business agent of local 2499 of the United Brotherhood of Carpenters and Joiners of America before being elected to the Yukon Legislative Assembly. He taught karate and also volunteered as a minor hockey coach, coaching one of the Yukon's teams to the Arctic Winter Games and the Canada Winter Games. He was married to Louise Hardy, the Yukon's former federal Member of Parliament.

Political career
He was first elected to the Yukon Legislative Assembly for the riding of Whitehorse Centre in the 1996 Yukon general election and was narrowly defeated in the 2000 election. Hardy was one of the founders of Habitat for Humanity in the Yukon. He became leader of the Yukon NDP in 2002 and won his Whitehorse Centre seat in the general election held that year.

In August 2006, Hardy was sent to Vancouver for leukemia treatment. Hardy fought the 2006, general election from his hospital bed through near daily telephone conferences with local reporters and the NDP candidates. He returned to Whitehorse just a week before the vote and still managed to win his seat. His party, however, though leading in the polls for months going into the election was reduced to three seats and third party status.

Hardy maintained his seat in the legislature and title of leader despite frequent trips out of the territory for continued monitoring and treatment during the spring sitting in 2007. He continued in his duties until the 2010 spring sitting, when his surprised his colleagues by sitting in the legislature despite his illness.

Citing his ongoing health issues, he announced on February 5, 2009, his intent to resign as party leader. This took effect on September 26, 2009, when Elizabeth Hanson was acclaimed as the new leader.

Death
Todd Hardy died at home after a long battle with leukemia at age 53 surrounded by close family.

Electoral record

Yukon general election, 2006

|-
 
|NDP
|Todd Hardy
|align="right"| 357
|align="right"| 46.6%
|align="right"| +13.4%
|-
 
|Liberal
|Bernie Phillips
|align="right"| 211
|align="right"| 27.5%
|align="right"| +3.4%
|-

|-
! align=left colspan=3|Total
! align=right| 766
! align=right| 100.0%
! align=right| –
|}

Yukon general election, 2002

|-
 
|NDP
|Todd Hardy
|align="right"| 300
|align="right"| 33.2%
|align="right"| -0.7%
|-
 
|Liberal
|Bernie Phillips
|align="right"| 218
|align="right"| 24.1%
|align="right"| -22.1%
|-

|Independent
|Mike McLarnon
|align="right"| 207
|align="right"| 2.9%
|align="right"| –
|-

|-
! align=left colspan=3|Total
! align=right| 904
! align=right| 100.0%
! align=right| –
|}

Yukon general election, 2000

|-
 
|Liberal
|Mike McLarnon
|align="right"| 312
|align="right"| 46.2%
|align="right"| +23.0%
|-
 
|NDP
|Todd Hardy
|align="right"| 229
|align="right"| 33.9%
|align="right"| -11.9%
|-

|-
! align=left colspan=3|Total
! align=right| 676
! align=right| 100.0%
! align=right| –
|}

Yukon general election, 1996

|-
 
|NDP
|Todd Hardy
|align="right"| 328
|align="right"| 45.8%
|align="right"| +8.3%
|-

|-
 
|Liberal
|Jon Breen
|align="right"| 166
|align="right"| 23.2%
|align="right"| -1.7%
|-
! align=left colspan=3|Total
! align=right| 716
! align=right| 100.0%
! align=right| –
|}

References

1957 births
2010 deaths
Canadian socialists
Canadian carpenters
Canadian trade unionists
Deaths from cancer in Yukon
Deaths from leukemia
People from Langley, British Columbia (district municipality)
Yukon New Democratic Party leaders
21st-century Canadian politicians